Quartz Compositor is the display server (and at the same time the compositing window manager) in macOS. It is responsible for presenting and maintaining rasterized, rendered graphics from the rest of the Core Graphics framework and other renderers in the Quartz technologies family.

Overview 
The bitmap output from Quartz 2D, OpenGL, Core Image, QuickTime, or other process is written to a specific memory location, or backing store. The Compositor then reads the data from the backing stores and assembles each into one image for the display, writing that image to the frame buffer memory of the graphics card. Quartz Compositor only accepts raster data, and is the only process that can directly access the graphics frame buffer.

In managing individual windows, Quartz Compositor accepts a bitmap image of the window's contents from its renderer, along with its position. The choice of the renderer is up to the individual application, although most use Quartz 2D. Quartz Compositor then acts as a "visual mixing board," by adding the given window to the whole scene for the display.

In its role as window manager, Quartz Compositor also has an event queue which receives events, such as key strokes and mouse clicks. The Quartz Compositor takes the events from the queue, determines which process owns the window where the event occurred, and passes the event on to the process.

Quartz Extreme 
Mac OS X v10.2 introduced Quartz Extreme: graphics processor (GPU) acceleration for the Quartz Compositor. With Quartz Extreme, far fewer central processing unit (CPU) cycles are needed for scene composition. Instead, the Quartz Compositor encapsulates each rendered backing store in an OpenGL texture map or surface. It then directs the GPU to compose the surfaces and maps to provide the final image, which is delivered to the frame buffer.

Quartz Extreme only uses OpenGL commands, and requires a graphics card connected to an AGP 2X or faster bus (including AGP 4X, 8X, and PCI Express), supporting textures and maps of arbitrary size, since many of the renderers have no size limitation (Quartz 2D for example). In Mac OS X Tiger, it is automatically enabled on Mac systems with one of the following types of graphics cards:
 AMD (ATI) Radeon, AGP-based, 16 MB VRAM minimum, or better
 NVIDIA GeForce2 MX, 16 MB VRAM minimum, or better

As of OS X El Capitan, Quartz Extreme is enabled on all supported Macs.

QuartzGL 
QuartzGL (called Quartz 2D Extreme when it was introduced in Mac OS X Tiger) is GPU acceleration for the Quartz 2D API. With QuartzGL enabled, all Quartz drawing commands are translated to OpenGL commands and executed on the GPU. This differs from Quartz Extreme, which still executes Quartz drawing commands on the CPU but performs final composition using the GPU.

As of OS X Mountain Lion, QuartzGL is still not enabled by default. However, it is possible to enable it using the Quartz Debug application included in the Apple Developer Tools. QuartzGL will be disabled once again upon quitting the Quartz Debug utility. A workaround is to force quit the Quartz Debug application, which will leave QuartzGL enabled system-wide.

All graphics cards capable of supporting Core Image also support QuartzGL.

See also 
 Quartz
 Compositing window manager
 X11
 Wayland
 DXGI
 Desktop Window Manager

References

External links 
 The Graphics and Windowing Environment - from Apple's Mac OS X Documentation
 Quartz Services Reference

Compositing window managers
Display servers
MacOS user interface